Lester Park Golf Course is one of two public golf courses located in the port city of Duluth, Minnesota. The original eighteen-hole golf course was made up the north shore of Duluth, near the Lester Park River. The golf course was established in 1934. The other course, Enger Park, is located near the Duluth landmark, Enger Tower, and was established earlier than Lester in the 1920s. Lester Park is well known around Minnesota for its spectacular beauty and rich history as a golf course because a unique view of Lake Superior is available on 20 of the 27 golf holes. The original 18 holes have been redone four times since their initial design. In 1997, Paul Schintz, a former club pro from St. Paul, took over Lester Park as PGA Golf Professional.  In 2003, Schintz became the Director of Golf, overseeing both Lester Park and Enger Park clubhouse operations. The golf courses were split to a 2 golf pro / 2 contract setup in 2005 with the addition of Steve Anderson to Enger Park Golf Course, with Schintz remaining at Lester Park. In 2007, the Duluth city council voted to accept a contract with Professional Golf Management, Inc.  The Management company consisted of partners Schintz, as PGA Golf Professional and Jud Crist, Golf Course Superintendent. The management company now operates both facilities for the City of Duluth, overseeing clubhouse and maintenance operations. Management Inc.
Lester Park's front and back nines are a full par 72 golf course and has a yardage of 6,828 yards from the hardest tees.

History
The history of the golf course started with the glaciation of Minnesota providing a rich landscape of hills and fertile soil; prime golf course potential to the developers of Duluth. The current course that was available at the time was too far for some people to commit to so the city decided to build another golf course in 1934 out in the northeastern part of the city. The land for city development in Lakeside was donated in 1890 by Oliver Iron Mining president Thomas Cole.

The course
The golf course has 27 holes with an 18-hole course and then a tougher, more challenging, 9-hole course. The grass itself in the fairway is a bluegrass of the Poa Genus. The greens were originally designed with Bermuda Grass but due to recent harsh weathers the grass on the green has been switched in many spots to bentgrass due to bent's ability to survive in harsher conditions, and for its ability to be cut at very short lengths without being damaged and allowing for a lot of foot traffic at the same time. The course contains four different sets of tee boxes ranging from a red colored tee, known for being the shortest distance to the hole; the farthest tees are blue colored. A group making tee times at the golf course, unless larger than 10 people can usually call up to one week in advance to obtain a desired tee time. The Cancellation policy as stated on their website says that 24 hours in the maximum time to cancel.

References

Golf clubs and courses in Minnesota
Buildings and structures in Duluth, Minnesota
Tourist attractions in Duluth, Minnesota
1934 establishments in Minnesota
Sports venues completed in 1934